Ettore Milano (26 July 1925 – 21 October 2011) was an Italian racing cyclist. He rode in the Tour de France in 1949, 1950 and 1951, placing 51st–52nd. In 1953, he won two stages of the Giro d'Italia.

References

External links
 

1925 births
2011 deaths
Italian male cyclists
Sportspeople from the Province of Alessandria
Cyclists from Piedmont